A dichlorodifluoroethylene (systematically named dichlorodifluoroethene) is one of three compounds with the chemical formula . Dichlorodifluoroethylenes are colourless gases, and are some of the simplest chlorodifluoroalkenes.

The structural isomers are used as intermediates or precursors in the production of other industrial chemicals.

1,1-Dichloro-2,2-difluoroethylene 

1,1-Dichloro-2,2-difluoroethylene is a low-boiling liquid that is used a refrigerant. It may also be used as a solvent, but has practical limitations as such, because of its low boiling point (commercial listings, 19 °C; lit. 17 °C).

It is regarded as a hazardous chemical for being toxic by inhalation (see MSDS), and a low-boiling liquid, and it causes irritation when it comes into contact with the skin and mucous membranes. Its ASHRAE number is R-1112a, and its CAS number is 79-35-6. Concentrated 1,1-dichloro-2,2-difluoroethylene can be ignited with ease in the laboratory.

cis- And trans-1,2-dichloro-1,2-difluoroethylene 

The diastereomers were co-isolated first in 1965, by using a combination of fractional melting and fractional distillation. The cis isomer's ASHRAE number is R-1112c, and its CAS number is 311-81-9. The trans isomer's ASHRAE number is R-1112t, and its CAS number is 381-71-5. The diastereomers are commercially only available as a mixtures of varying proportions.

References

External links 
 MSDS

Chlorofluorocarbons
Refrigerants